John Hickton was the District Attorney for Allegheny County, Pennsylvania from April 4, 1974 until January 1976.

Prior to his serving as District Attorney he was Allegheny County Solicitor and Port Authority of Allegheny County chief council.

He died on June 15, 2002.

See also

 District Attorney
 Pittsburgh Police
 Allegheny County Sheriff
 Allegheny County Police Department

References

Lawyers from Pittsburgh
County district attorneys in Pennsylvania
2002 deaths
Year of birth missing